Canovate Group of Companies is a manufacturer of industrial enclosures, server cabinets, fiber optic connectivity and data center products.

Products 
Designs, Develops, Manufactures and Markets:
 Fibre Optic  Connectivity based FTTX & Fiber Optic Transmission-Access Products
 Data Center & Data Center Cooling Products & Solutions
 Rack Cabinets,  Enclosure Cabinets, Boxes & Accessories
 Outdoor Enclosures, Frames, Boxes & Accessories
 Structured cabling products
 PDUs and UPS
 Remote Monitoring, Access and Management
 Flat Display Mounting Interfaces, HDMI Cables & Screen Cleaners

Facts and figures 
 Headquarters: Alemdag, Istanbul, Turkey
 Present worth exceeds 250 Million USD 
 Serves 40,000 customers in more than 60 countries on six continents
 300 employees, 50 engineers 
 ISO 9001 approved 
 Operates in its 26,000m2  manufacturing facilities in Istanbul
 Invests 15% of revenues annually to its research and development of products, solutions and new technologies along with various awarded patents

References

Multinational companies
Electronics companies of Turkey
Electrical equipment manufacturers
Manufacturing companies based in Istanbul
Uninterruptible power supply